The River to River Trail is a 160 mile (256 km)-long hiking trail that serves Shawnee National Forest in far southern Illinois.  The trail is used by both equestrians and hikers. About half is on off road trails. Its eastern terminus has historically been Battery Rock, overlooking the Ohio River but now generally Elizabethtown, Illinois is used as the eastern terminus. The western terminus is in Grand Tower, Illinois, at the Mississippi River.  Sections of the River to River Trail form part of the Southern Section of the American Discovery Trail.

From east to west, the trail serves the following settlements and resources:

 Elizabethtown, Illinois
 Garden of the Gods Wilderness
 One Horse Gap
 Lusk Creek Wilderness
 Eddyville, Illinois
 Jackson Falls climbing area
 Tunnel Hill State Trail
 Ferne Clyffe State Park
 Panther Den Wilderness
 Crab Orchard Wilderness
 Giant City State Park
 Makanda, Illinois
 Bald Knob Wilderness
 Clear Springs Wilderness
 Grand Tower, Illinois

The River to River Trail Society has published a guidebook to the trail's campsites, orientation, safe water sources, and other useful information.  A significant spur trail serves Elizabethtown, Illinois.

Waypoints

Following are waypoints on the trail:

References

External Map and Hiking Journal Links
Hiking Project Downloadable gpx from 2017.
Full trail on OpenStreetmap.org
Full trail downloadable GPX at Way Marked Trails
Trail Journals for River to River Trail
Trail Run Project

Protected areas of Gallatin County, Illinois
Protected areas of Hardin County, Illinois
Protected areas of Jackson County, Illinois
Protected areas of Johnson County, Illinois
Protected areas of Pope County, Illinois
Protected areas of Saline County, Illinois
Protected areas of Union County, Illinois
Protected areas of Williamson County, Illinois
Hiking trails in Illinois
Shawnee National Forest
Long-distance trails in the United States